The Utility Clothing Scheme was a rationing scheme introduced in the United Kingdom during the Second World War. In response to the shortage of clothing materials and labour due to wartime austerity, the Board of Trade sponsored the creation of ranges of "utility clothing" meeting tight regulations regarding the amount of material and labour allowed to be used in their construction. Utility clothing, and later utility furniture, was marked with the CC41 tag. In spite of its austere specifications, utility clothing designs were commissioned from leading fashion designers including Hardy Amies, Norman Hartnell and other members of the Incorporated Society of London Fashion Designers.

Utility clothing
During the war, the government took control of supplies of raw materials for manufacturing utility garments. They imposed regulations that took into consideration the economic condition of the country. Conserving raw materials such as cloth, wool, leather etc. was advisable because of limited supplies. Manufacturers had their quota to produce utility clothing which was 85% of the total production. The Board of Trade allowed the 15% left for the garment industry to create non-utility clothing by meeting the style required in the regulations.

The garment industry was encouraged to produce limited stocks in order to sustain the needs of civilians and reduce the choices available to buyers and to maintain an essential quantity of garments. Utility garments were liable to price control to be sold at low prices so that civilians could afford an outfit of reasonable quality. Utility clothing continued into children's wear, which also had the same CC41 label.

In spite of regulations and the limitation of raw materials, manufacturers and the garment industry created a variety of styles and colours of Utility clothing of satisfactory quality.

Utility shoes

Utility women's shoes were chunky and solid. They had wedges or low,  heels. Open-toed shoes were prohibited as impractical and unsafe.

Details of CC41

No superfluous decoration was allowed. It should be simple, practical, agreeable-looking, inexpensive and made of good material.

References

External links

A brief history of CC41 - The Utility Clothing Scheme with examples. It's Beyond My Control

Austerity in the United Kingdom (1939–1954)
United Kingdom home front during World War II
1940s fashion